The minister for foreign affairs handles the Finnish Government's foreign policy and relations, and is in charge of the Ministry for Foreign Affairs. The minister for foreign trade and development is also associated with this ministry.

The current minister for foreign affairs is Pekka Haavisto of Green League.

Constitutional mandate

Section 93 (Competence in the area of foreign policy issues) of the Constitution of Finland says the following:

This last paragraph specifies the constitutional responsibility of the minister for foreign affairs.

List of ministers for foreign affairs

See also
 Sipilä cabinet
 Rinne cabinet
 Marin cabinet

References

External links 
 Official Site of Ministry for Foreign Affairs of Finland

-
Foreign relations of Finland
Foreign

zh:芬兰外交部